Oksana Volodymyrivna Zakharchuk (born April 3, 1980 in Ostroh) is a retired Ukrainian shot putter. She represented her nation Ukraine in the women's shot put at the 2004 Summer Olympics, and also set a personal best of 19.05 metres from the national athletics meet in Kyiv.

Zakharchuk qualified for the Ukrainian squad in the women's shot put at the 2004 Summer Olympics in Athens. Nearly a week before the Games commenced, she attained a personal best and an Olympic A-standard of 19.05 metres on her last bid from the national athletics meet in Kyiv. During the prelims, Zakharchuk unleashed the ball into the field with her best possible effort at 17.28 on her second attempt, falling short to reach her two-week-old personal best by 177 centimetres. As she committed a foul in her final shot, Zakharchuk's feat was worthily enough to secure a twentieth spot from a roster of thirty-eight athletes in the overall standings, nearly missing out the final round by 0.88 metres behind the last qualifier Li Meiju of China.

References

External links

1980 births
Living people
Ukrainian female shot putters
Olympic athletes of Ukraine
Athletes (track and field) at the 2004 Summer Olympics
People from Ostroh
Sportspeople from Rivne Oblast